The Volcanic Hills are a low mountain range in the Colorado Desert, near the border in southern San Diego County, California.

References 

Mountain ranges of the Colorado Desert
Mountain ranges of San Diego County, California